Hurricane Jeanne was a moderate hurricane that formed and dissipated in the Gulf of Mexico without making landfall, only one of four occurrences in the 20th century. The thirteenth tropical cyclone, tenth named storm, and eighth hurricane of the 1980 Atlantic hurricane season, Jeanne developed over the southern Caribbean on November 7. It moved swiftly northward, and it intensified to a tropical storm on November 9. It entered the southern Gulf of Mexico on November 10. It weakened on November 12, and its forward motion slowed; the cyclone weakened further to a tropical storm because of dry air intrusion, and it executed a clockwise loop on November 15. It dissipated on November 16.

At the time, Jeanne was one of three November hurricanes in the Gulf of Mexico; it was the first tropical cyclone to attain hurricane strength in the Gulf of Mexico during November. The late season storm surprised maritime interests, and two barges broke free from towing vessels. Minor beach erosion occurred along the Texas coast, where tides were two to four feet above normal; coastal flooding affected the state, which was heavily impacted by tropical cyclones in August and September. Jeanne caused no deaths.

Meteorological history

Its origins were traced to a tropical wave that originated over western Africa on October 26. Atmospheric conditions resembled an early fall pattern, and a large ridge was situated over the Gulf of Mexico and Southwestern United States. The depression moved northward into the Caribbean Sea, and the environment supported further development. On November 9, the depression strengthened to a  tropical storm and was given the name Jeanne. The tropical cyclone moved northward into the southern Gulf of Mexico on November 10. Jeanne's northward movement was blocked by the ridge, and the cyclone slowly turned to the west.

On November 12, Jeanne weakened to a Category 1 hurricane. It entered the western Gulf of Mexico, and its forward motion diminished as the ridge moved east. Later, Jeanne diminished to a  tropical storm. A developing trough remained west of Jeanne, and the cyclone was embedded in a weak pressure gradient. Jeanne weakened to a depression on November 14. It executed a clockwise loop, and it merged with the frontal boundary on November 16.

Preparations
Some residents on Dauphin Island voluntarily evacuated, spurred by memories of 1979's Hurricane Frederic and Jeanne's northward motion. 3,000 workers evacuated their oil rigs because of Jeanne's high waves. The National Hurricane Center advised small watercraft to remain in ports from Brownsville to Tarpon Springs. Forecasters expected tides of 2 feet above normal in Louisiana, which increased to 4 feet above normal along coastal Texas. In Terrebonne and Lafourche parishes, schools were closed because of uncertainties regarding Jeanne's path. The hurricane center also expected Jeanne to make landfall in southwestern Louisiana, although the hurricane eventually stayed offshore; thousands of residents moved inland, while Civil Defense officials remained alert. Forecasters expected locally heavy rainfall, although they suggested it would remain below .

Impact

The combination of a large high pressure system and Jeanne produced rough seas over the northern Gulf of Mexico; wave heights reached . It remains the record 24-hour November rainfall total for the city as of 2018. The previous record was set in 1954. The heavy precipitation was attributed to a mesoscale feature; an inflow band intersected with an adjacent stationary front, which also contributed to the deluge. Schools and most businesses were closed, while flights were grounded at Key West International Airport; authorities urged residents to stay home. Telephone and power services were cut to some areas of the city.

Elsewhere, several ships were caught off guard by the late arrival of Jeanne. The cyclone entered the Gulf of Mexico, and two barges broke loose from towing vessels via strong winds and high waves. One barge was an oil rig tender that contained 16 people; it was carried several hundred miles across the central Gulf of Mexico. All crew members survived, and there were no maritime deaths related to the hurricane. Jeanne produced a prolonged period of rough surf and heavy swells along the Texas coast. The hurricane caused coastal flooding; the worst flooding occurred near Galveston.

Jeanne was one of only four tropical cyclones in the 20th century to attain hurricane status in the Gulf of Mexico without making landfall; the others were Laurie of 1969, Henri of 1979, and Alberto of 1982.

See also

List of Texas hurricanes
List of Category 2 Atlantic hurricanes
Other storms of the same name

References

1980 Atlantic hurricane season
Category 2 Atlantic hurricanes
Hurricanes in Texas
Hurricane Jeanne
Jeanne